Patricia Spears Jones (born 1951) is an American poet. She is the author of five books of poetry. Jones is the editor of "The Future Differently Imagined", an issue of About Place Journal, the online publication of Black Earth Institute. Previously, she was the co-editor for Ordinary Women: Poems of New York City Women. Her poem "Beuys and the Blonde" was nominated for a Pushcart Prize. Jones was the winner of the Jackson Poetry Prize for 2017, and she will serve as the 2020 Louis D. Rubin Jr. Writer-in-Residence at Hollins University.

A native of Forrest City, Arkansas, Jones lives in New York City. She received her BA from Rhodes College in 1973, and her MFA from Vermont College in 1992. She has been a constant presence in the New York writing community.

Bibliography
Poetry collections
 A Lucent Fire: New and Selected Poems (White Pine Press, 2015) 
 Living in the Love Economy (Overpass Books, 2014) 
 Painkiller: Poems (Tia Chucha Press, 2010) 
 Femme du Monde (Tia Chucha Press, 2006) 
 The Weather That Kills (Coffee House Press, 1995)

Honors and awards
 1994 — National Endowment for the Arts (NEA) Literature Fellowship, recipient
 1996 — Foundation for Contemporary Arts Grants to Artists award
 2000 — Featured in The Best American Poetry (edited by Rita Dove)
 2017 — Jackson Poetry Prize (awarded by Poets & Writers)
 2018 — Rauschenberg Foundation Resident—Captiva Island, Florida
 2018 — Her poem "Seraphim" listed in the New Yorker's Years in Poems

References

External links

 Patricia Spears Jones Official Homepage
 Bio at Tennessee Authors
 Bio at Poets & Writers
 Patricia Spears Jones books on Amazon
 Patricia Spears Jones papers, 1970s-2010s, held by Manuscripts, Archives and Rare Books Division, Schomburg Center for Research in Black Culture, New York Public Library.

1951 births
Living people
American women poets
English-language poets
National Endowment for the Arts Fellows
Rhodes College alumni
Vermont College of Fine Arts alumni
Poets from Arkansas
Poets from New York (state)
20th-century American poets
20th-century American women writers
21st-century American women